Frederik Adeler (1700-1766) was a Dano-Norwegian government official and landowner. He served as a County Governor and County Governor of several counties in Norway and Denmark from 1727 until his death in 1766.

He was the son of Privy Councilor Frederick Christian von Adeler (died 1726) and grandson of Admiral Cort Adeler. He traveled abroad in 1722 with two of his brothers, visited Germany and the Netherlands, England, France and Italy in 4 years, and shortly after his return in 1726 became chamberlain to Queen Anna Sophie. At the same time as his marriage in 1727, he became a state councilor and county governor of Kalundborg, Sæbygård, Dragsholm and Holbæk counties in Denmark. In 1749, he was made a Knight of the Order of the Dannebrog. In 1751, he exchanged jobs with his brother-in-law Joachim Hartwig Johann von Barner and he became the Diocesan Governor of Christianssand as well as the County Governor of Nedenæs amt. He died in Christiansand on 28 December 1766 and was buried with great solemnity at the Christianssand Cathedral on 20 January 1767.

In Norway, he owned the manor located at the old Gimsøy Abbey in Skien in Bratsberg county. In Denmark, he owned Gundetved (now Selchausdal) as well as Egemarke and Alkestrup in Sjælland.

On 25 April 1727, he married Anne Beate Rosenkrantz at Frederiksborg Castle in Denmark. She was a daughter of Jørgen Rosenkrantz. Together, they had several children including Frederik Georg Adeler.  After her husband's death, she lived as a widow at Gimsøy Abbey and was praised as a wise and excellent lady, while it is said of her husband, notwithstanding several good qualities, that he was "known for his narrow-mindedness".

References

1700 births
1766 deaths
County governors of Norway